Hans Olof "Hasse" Jeppson (10 May 1925 – 21 February 2013) was a Swedish professional footballer who played as a striker. He was known for his impressive goals to games ratio at several clubs, and represented Örgryte IS, Djurgårdens IF, Charlton Athletic, Atalanta, Napoli and Torino during a career that spanned between 1946 and 1957. A full international between 1949 and 1950, he won 12 caps and scored nine goals for the Sweden national team and helped them to a third-place finish at the 1950 FIFA World Cup.

Club career
Jeppson began his career with Djurgårdens IF, transferring to Charlton Athletic where he played 11 matches in 1951, before moving to Italy to join Atalanta (1951–1952). Jeppson was the second Swedish player to be transferred to an English team, after Dan Ekner at Portsmouth.

He then moved to Napoli (1952–56) and Torino F.C. (1956–57) in the 1950s. In 1951 was bought from Atalanta. In 1952 he was sold to Napoli for 105 million lira, a new world record transfer-fee (for this reason the Napoli's fans nicknamed him o' banco e' napule, the bank of Naples). Jeppson played for Napoli from 1952 to 1956 scoring 52 goals. In 1956 Jeppson was sold to Torino. He retired in 1957.

International career

Jeppson played the 1950 FIFA World Cup in Brazil for Sweden and scored two goals as Sweden finished third. He played 12 games in total for the Sweden national team and scored nine goals. His Swedish nickname was Hasse Guldfot (Hasse Golden Foot).

Career statistics

International 

 Scores and results list Sweden's goal tally first, score column indicates score after each Jeppson goal.

Honours 
Djurgårdens IF
 Division 2 Nordöstra: 1948–49
Sweden
 FIFA World Cup third place: 1950
Individual
 Allsvenskan top scorer: 1950–51
 Stor Grabb: 1950
 Swedish Football Hall of Fame inductee: 2009

References

External links
  

1925 births
2013 deaths
People from Kungsbacka
Swedish footballers
Association football forwards
Sweden international footballers
1950 FIFA World Cup players
Djurgårdens IF Fotboll players
Charlton Athletic F.C. players
Atalanta B.C. players
S.S.C. Napoli players
Torino F.C. players
Allsvenskan players
Serie A players
Swedish expatriate footballers
Expatriate footballers in England
Expatriate footballers in Italy
Sportspeople from Halland County